The Beška Monastery is a Serbian Orthodox monastery on Beška island on Skadar Lake built in the Principality of Zeta of the Serbian Despotate (modern-day Montenegro). It has two churches within its complex, the Church of St. George and the St Mary's Church. This church was uninhabited and owned by a local mosque until a negotiation led to ownership falling into the hands of the Serbian Orthodox Church. This church doesn’t represent the local communities who are majority Albanian Muslims.

Church of St. George 
The Church of St. George was built at the end of the 14th century by Đurađ II Balšić the Lord of Zeta from 1385 to 1403. His widow Jelena Balšić reconstructed it before she built St Mary's Church in 1439/1440.

St Mary's Church 
The St Mary's Church or Church of Holy Mother was built in 1439/1440 as the legacy of Jelena Balšić which is also confirmed by the inscription on the monastery. Jelena died in Beška monastery and was buried in the St Mary's Church.

The sacred bones of Jelena Balšić were placed in new relic case made of stone after the Church of Holy Mother she built on Beška island was reconstructed in 2002 by the Metropolitanate of Montenegro and the Littoral. By the decision of the 'Metropolitanate of Montenegro and the Littoral' in 2006 she was titled 'Blagovjerna' and named Blagovjerna Jelena Lazareva Balšić.

Notes

See also 
List of Serb Orthodox monasteries

Buildings and structures completed in 1440
15th-century Serbian Orthodox church buildings
Serbian Orthodox monasteries in Montenegro
Buildings and structures in Bar, Montenegro
Burial sites of the Lazarević dynasty
Medieval Serbian Orthodox monasteries
Balšić noble family
Medieval Montenegro